This is a list of films produced in the Netherlands during the 2020s.

2020

2021

2022

2023

2024

Unknown

References 

2020s
Films
Dutch